The 1988 West German Athletics Championships was the 88th edition of the national championship in outdoor track and field for West Germany. It was held on 22–24 July at the Waldstadion in Frankfurt. It served as the selection meeting for West Germany at the 1988 Summer Olympics.

Championships
As in previous years, national championship titles were awarded in various places besides the main track and field championship.

 Cross country running – Waiblingen, 12 March, with individual and team rankings in long and short course races
 Marathon – Hamburg, 24 April, incorporated into the Hamburg Marathon with individual and team rankings
 Racewalking – Eschborn, 24 April, with individual and team rankings in 10 km walk for women and 50 km walk for men
 Mountain running – Bühlertal in the Black Forest, 1 October, incorporated into the Hundseck-Berglaufs
 Relay – Lübeck, 10 July, incorporated in the German Junior Championships with 3 × 800 m relay for women and 4 × 800 m and 4 × 1500 m for men
 Combined events – Rhede, 9–10 July, with individual and team rankings in men's decathlon and women's heptathlon
 Road running – Herten, 11 September, with individual and team rankings in women's 15 km and men's 25 km
 100K run – Hamm-Heessen, 8 October with individual rankings for men and women, and a men's team ranking

Results

Men

Women

References 

 Leichtathletik Historie . Sport Komplett. Retrieved 2019-07-13.
 Fritz Steinmetz: Deutsche Leichtathletik-Meisterschaften Band 4 (1988–1993). Hornberger-Verlag, Waldfischbach 1994

2018
West German Athletics Championships
West German Championships
Athletics Championships
Sport in Rostock